Siionin virret ("Hymns of Zion") is a hymnbook of the Finnish Awakening religious revival movement (Herännäisyys). The hymnal is used in the traditional conventicle 'seurat' which is an informal religious gathering taking often place in homes. Hymns of Zion are also sung in the religious summer festival 'Herättäjäjuhlat' of the Awakening movement. 

A remarkable part of the hymns derive from the Swedish collection of songs Sions sånger from the 1740s. The first edition of the book was published in 1790. A new edition was produced by Wilhelmi Malmivaara in 1893 with 157 hyms. Jaakko Haavio edited the next revision which was published in 1971. The current edition dates to 2017 and contains 255 hymns.

Wilhelmi Malmivaara's extensive revision published in 1892 was translated in its entirety into English by Thomas McElwain and published under the title 'Songs of Zion' in 2014.

External links
 Siionin Virret - Index, texts and melodies of the hymns.
 English translations - Selection of hymns in English.

References

Lutheran hymnals
Finnish Christian hymns
1790 books
1790 in music
Finnish Awakening